Carrie Turner may refer to:

Carrie Turner (actress) (1863-1897), American stage actress
Karri Turner, American television actress
Carrie Turner (character), a fictional character from the American television drama 24